Cagliostro is a 1929 silent drama film directed by Richard Oswald and starring Hans Stüwe, Renée Héribel and Alfred Abel. It depicts the life of the eighteenth century Italian occultist Alessandro Cagliostro, portraying him more sympathetically than in most other works. It was based on a novel by Johannes von Guenther.

Cast

Release
Caligostro premiered in Berlin on 8 April 1929. It was later shown in Paris on 21 May 1929. In the early 1930s, Universal Pictures planned a Cagliostro film starring Boris Karloff in the title role, which was later re-written into the script for The Mummy.

Reception
A reviewer in Variety commented on the film on a screening in Germany, stating that "Richard Oswald always gets somebody to invest money again in his productions and always turns out about the same sort of product. A lot of pomp, scenery and costumes and nothing that grips in the acting line." and that Oswald "leaves Continental audiences as cold as he would American ones."

References

Bibliography

External links

1929 films
1920s historical films
1920s biographical films
French historical films
French biographical films
German historical films
German biographical films
Films of the Weimar Republic
German silent feature films
French silent feature films
Films directed by Richard Oswald
Films based on German novels
Films set in France
Films set in the 18th century
Films about Alessandro Cagliostro
Works about the Affair of the Diamond Necklace
Cultural depictions of Louis XVI
Films about Marie Antoinette
German black-and-white films
1920s German films
1920s French films